The Shenfield–Southend line is a branch line off the Great Eastern Main Line in Essex, in the east of England. The vast majority of services connect to or from the Great Eastern Main Line and its London terminus at Liverpool Street.

The line is part of the Network Rail Strategic Route 7, SRS 07.05, and is classified as a London and South East commuter line. Passenger services on the line are currently operated by Greater Anglia.

History
The 15 stations on these "New Essex" lines were the epitome of the "domestic revival" style, pioneered on the GER by the company's architect, W. N. Ashbee, which came to be known as the New Essex or Ashbee style. The stations on the Shenfield–Southend line are largely in their original form, including the platform canopies.

Throughout its history, the line has had three different systems of electrification, all of which have used overhead lines to carry the electric current. The first system, commissioned in 1956, used 1500 V DC, following the commissioning of the main line from London to Shenfield in 1949. That replaced an intensive steam service. In the 1960s, the electric supply was converted to 6.25 kV, 50 Hz AC, as part of the decision by the British Transport Commission to adopt 25 kV 50 Hz AC electrification as the standard system, rather than 1500 V DC. The line was not immediately converted to 25 kV AC due to problems with clearances under bridges. In 1979, the supply was converted to 25 kV AC, following more research into the permissible clearances between the overhead wires and other structures. Between 2017 and 2020 the overhead line equipment (OHLE) was renewed with an auto-tensioning system. The former 3-wire compound catenary was replaced with a simple 2-wire catenary with new and reused structural steel-work and new wire supports, insulators and registration arms.

Infrastructure

The line is signalled for bidirectional working; there are crossovers at Mountnessing junction, Billericay, Wickford and Hockley.

Stations 

Services 
All the stations and services on the line are currently operated by Greater Anglia. The company took over from National Express East Anglia in 2012, which in turn had replaced the previous operator First Great Eastern in 2004, when all the operators in East Anglia were merged into one new franchise. First Great Eastern (owned by FirstGroup) had operated the Great Eastern franchise from January 1997 until March 2004.

Trains are formed of Class 720 units. A typical journey along the length of the line takes 35 minutes.

References

External links
Electrification Liverpool Street to Shenfield from The London & North Eastern Railway (LNER) Encyclopedia
Google Maps showing stations and route

Rail transport in Essex
EA 1050
Railway lines in the East of England
Standard gauge railways in England
Airport rail links in London